Lisna, Líšná or Lişna may refer to the following:

Places

Poland
 Lisna, Poland

Czech Republic
 Líšná (Přerov District)
 Líšná (Rokycany District)
 Líšná (Žďár nad Sázavou District)

Romania
  Lişna, village in Suharău commune

Science
Lisna (genus), a genus of goblin spiders